Winogradskyella pocilloporae is a Gram-negative, strictly aerobic and rod-shaped bacterium from the genus of Winogradskyella which has been isolated from the coral Pocillopora damicornis.

References

Flavobacteria
Bacteria described in 2018